Racing Romance is a 1937 British comedy film directed by Maclean Rogers and starring Bruce Seton, Marjorie Taylor and Eliot Makeham. It was made as a quota quickie for release by RKO Pictures.

Cast
 Bruce Seton as Harry Stone 
 Marjorie Taylor as Peggy Lanstone 
 Eliot Makeham as George Hanway 
 Sybil Grove as Mrs. Hanway 
 Elizabeth Kent as Muriel Hanway 
 Ian Fleming as Martin Royce 
 Robert Hobbs as James Archer 
 Charles Sewell as Mr. Lanstone

References

Bibliography
 Chibnall, Steve. Quota Quickies: The Birth of the British 'B' Film. British Film Institute, 2007.
 Low, Rachael. Filmmaking in 1930s Britain. George Allen & Unwin, 1985.
 Wood, Linda. British Films, 1927-1939. British Film Institute, 1986.

External links 
 

1937 films
British comedy films
1937 comedy films
Films directed by Maclean Rogers
British black-and-white films
RKO Pictures films
Quota quickies
1930s English-language films
1930s British films
English-language comedy films